Petr Kop (15 February 1937 – 27 January 2017) was a Czech volleyball player who competed for Czechoslovakia in the 1964 Summer Olympics and in the 1968 Summer Olympics. He was born in Prague.

In 1964, he was part of the Czechoslovak team which won the silver medal in the Olympic tournament. He played  in six matches.

Four years later, he won the bronze medal with the Czechoslovak team in the 1968 Olympic tournament. He played in seven matches.

Kop played in the Italian volleyball league for Virtus Pallavolo Bologna.

References

External links
 profile

1937 births
2017 deaths
Czech men's volleyball players
Czechoslovak men's volleyball players
Olympic volleyball players of Czechoslovakia
Volleyball players at the 1964 Summer Olympics
Volleyball players at the 1968 Summer Olympics
Olympic silver medalists for Czechoslovakia
Olympic bronze medalists for Czechoslovakia
Olympic medalists in volleyball
Medalists at the 1968 Summer Olympics
Medalists at the 1964 Summer Olympics
Sportspeople from Prague